Károly Kóródy (8 February 1887 – 8 June 1917) was a Hungarian footballer. He played in 15 matches for the Hungary national football team from 1908 to 1912. He was also part of Hungary's squad for the football tournament at the 1912 Summer Olympics, but he did not play in any matches.

References

1887 births
1917 deaths
Hungarian footballers
Hungary international footballers
Place of birth missing
Association football forwards